Tunnel Hill is an unincorporated community in northwestern Johnson County, Illinois. It is best known for its namesake railroad tunnel that gives the name to the Tunnel Hill State Trail, a rails-to-trails project developed by the Illinois Department of Natural Resources.

Unincorporated communities in Johnson County, Illinois
Unincorporated communities in Illinois
Railroad tunnels in Illinois
Buildings and structures in Johnson County, Illinois